The Canton of Blois-2 is a canton in the French department of Loir-et-Cher, Centre-Val de Loire, France. Its borders were modified at the French canton reorganisation which came into effect in March 2015. Its seat is in Blois.

It consists of the following communes:
Blois (partly)
La Chaussée-Saint-Victor
Menars
Saint-Denis-sur-Loire
Villebarou
Villerbon

References

Cantons of Loir-et-Cher